Theresa May formed the first May ministry in the United Kingdom on 13 July 2016, after having been invited by Queen Elizabeth II to form a new administration. Then the Home Secretary, May's appointment followed the resignation of then Prime Minister David Cameron. The ministry, a Conservative majority government, succeeded the second Cameron ministry which had been formed following the 2015 general election. Cameron's government was dissolved as a result of his resignation in the immediate aftermath of the June 2016 referendum on British withdrawal from the European Union.

After the 2017 snap general election resulted in a hung parliament, May formed a new minority government with support from the Democratic Unionist Party.

History
May announced her choices for Chancellor of the Exchequer, Home Secretary, Foreign Secretary and Defence Secretary in the evening of 13 July: Philip Hammond, Boris Johnson, and Amber Rudd were respectively appointed to the first three posts, while Michael Fallon continued as Defence Secretary. David Davis was appointed to the new post of Secretary of State for Exiting the European Union, while Liam Fox became Secretary of State for International Trade and President of the Board of Trade. Greg Clark, who was made business secretary, was mistakenly appointed as President of the Board of Trade by the Privy Council, and held the appointment for four days before the mistake was corrected.

May's choices for the remaining cabinet posts were announced on 14 July. Justine Greening, previously international development secretary, was promoted to education secretary, and the vacancy left by Greening was filled by Priti Patel. Liz Truss, formerly environment secretary, was given the justice portfolio. Andrea Leadsom, previously a junior energy minister, and also the final opponent of Theresa May in the 2016 Conservative leadership election, was made environment secretary. James Brokenshire and Karen Bradley, both formerly junior ministers at the Home Office, were given the posts of Northern Ireland and culture, media and sport respectively. Damian Green took the post of work and pensions secretary, and Chris Grayling was made transport secretary. Finally, Sajid Javid was given the communities and local government brief, Baroness Evans of Bowes Park became Lords Leader and David Lidington became Commons Leader.

Jeremy Hunt, Alun Cairns, and David Mundell retained the posts of health secretary, Welsh secretary, and Scottish secretary, respectively, which they had held during the second Cameron ministry. In contrast, May sacked six ministers from Cameron's Cabinet: Chancellor of the Exchequer George Osborne, Justice Secretary Michael Gove, Culture Secretary John Whittingdale, Education Secretary Nicky Morgan, Chancellor of the Duchy of Lancaster Oliver Letwin and Leader of the House of Lords Baroness Stowell of Beeston.

In addition, May appointed Fiona Hill and Nick Timothy as Downing Street Chiefs of Staff. Both had been political advisers to her at the Home Office, then worked outside government for a brief period before coming back to work on her leadership campaign.

Cabinet

List of ministers

Prime Minister and the Cabinet Office

Departments of state

Law officers

Parliament

Notes

References

2010s in British politics
2016 establishments in the United Kingdom
2017 disestablishments in the United Kingdom
British ministries
Cabinets disestablished in 2017
Cabinets established in 2016
Consequences of the 2016 United Kingdom European Union membership referendum
Government
Ministries of Elizabeth II
Ministry